Ralph Vernon Mann (born June 16, 1949) is a retired American sprinter and hurdler.  He was an undergraduate at Brigham Young University, and later earned a Ph.D. in Biomechanics from the Washington State University.

In 1969, Mann won his first NCAA 440 yard hurdles championship with a time of 49.6 seconds. Tying the NCAA and American records, the time was three-tenths of a second off the world record. A year later in Des Moines, Iowa, Mann captured his second NCAA championship and set a new world-record time of 48.8 seconds for the 440 intermediate hurdles. During his collegiate career Ralph was NCAA champion three times. He was a three-time All-American, and in 1970 was second in the voting for the Sullivan Award.

He competed in the 400 m hurdles at the 1972 Olympics and won the silver medal.  Ralph was a five-time AAU champion. He received the AAU’s DiBenedetto Award for the single most outstanding career, most notably for his Olympic silver medal. In 2015, he was inducted into the USA National Track and Field Hall of Fame.

Mann co-wrote the book Swing Like a Pro: The Breakthrough Scientific Method of Perfecting Your Golf Swing with Fred Griffin.  This book was the culmination of Mann's expertise in the field of biomechanics and Griffin's experience of teaching golf as a PGA Professional. Mann has two children, Amber and Randall, a poet and literary critic.

References

American male hurdlers
Olympic silver medalists for the United States in track and field
Athletes (track and field) at the 1972 Summer Olympics
Athletes (track and field) at the 1971 Pan American Games
Athletes (track and field) at the 1975 Pan American Games
Living people
1949 births
Brigham Young University alumni
Washington State University alumni
Medalists at the 1972 Summer Olympics
Pan American Games gold medalists for the United States
Pan American Games medalists in athletics (track and field)
Track and field athletes from Long Beach, California
Medalists at the 1971 Pan American Games
Medalists at the 1975 Pan American Games
BYU Cougars men's track and field athletes